Trevor Neil McFadden (born June 28, 1978) is an American attorney and jurist who serves as a United States district judge of the United States District Court for the District of Columbia. Previously, he was a Deputy Assistant Attorney General in the Criminal Division of the Department of Justice.

Biography
McFadden received his Bachelor of Arts, magna cum laude, from Wheaton College in Illinois, and his Juris Doctor from the University of Virginia School of Law, where he served on the editorial board of the Virginia Law Review.

He served as an Assistant United States Attorney in the District of Columbia and as counsel to the United States Deputy Attorney General. He also has experience as a law enforcement officer, having served as both a Deputy Sheriff in the Madison County Sheriff's Office and as a police officer with the Fairfax County Police Department.

McFadden clerked for Judge Steven Colloton on the United States Court of Appeals for the Eighth Circuit. He was previously a partner in the Compliance, Investigations & Government Enforcement Group in the Washington, D.C. office of Baker McKenzie, where he represented clients in white collar matters, including Foreign Corrupt Practices Act investigations, anti-money laundering compliance work and U.S. trade compliance matters.

Before becoming a judge, McFadden served as a Deputy Assistant Attorney General in the Criminal Division of the Department of Justice.

Federal judicial service

On June 7, 2017, President Donald Trump nominated McFadden to serve as a United States District Judge of the United States District Court for the District of Columbia, to the seat vacated by Judge Richard J. Leon, who assumed  senior status on December 31, 2016. A hearing on his nomination before the Senate Judiciary Committee was held on June 28, 2017. On July 20, 2017, his nomination was reported out of committee by a voice vote. On October 26, 2017, the United States Senate invoked cloture on his nomination by an 85–12 vote. On October 30, 2017, his nomination was confirmed by an 84–10 vote. He received his judicial commission on October 31, 2017.

Tenure and prominent decisions

Border wall
In April 2019, the U.S. House of Representatives requested that McFadden issue a preliminary injunction against the Trump administration's plan to divert about $6 billion from military construction and counter-drug appropriations to build a wall along the U.S.–Mexico border, arguing that the Trump administration's action violated the Constitution's Appropriations Clause. In June 2019, McFadden ruled that the House lacked standing to challenge the administration's diversion of funding and therefore dismissed the suit for lack of jurisdiction. This ruling contradicted the 2015 ruling of the U.S. District Court for the District of Columbia in U.S. House of Representatives v. Azar, in which the court found that then-Republican-controlled House of Representatives had standing in a lawsuit against President Obama's Affordable Care Act. In September 2020, the U.S. Court of Appeals for the D.C. Circuit overturned McFadden's decision and reinstated the House's lawsuit. Citing the McGahn case, the appellate court held that a single chamber of Congress has "standing to pursue litigation against the Executive for injury to its legislative rights"; the court also criticized the Trump administration's argument that "the Executive Branch can freely spend Treasury funds as it wishes unless and until a veto-proof majority of both houses of Congress forbids it" as a position that "turns the constitutional order upside down."

Trump tax returns
Congressman Richard Neal, chairman of the House Ways and Means Committee, has litigated to obtain Trump's tax returns, but McFadden has ruled other matters should be litigated prior to any such release. Trump's attorneys moved to dismiss the case, arguing congressional investigatory power is nonexistent. Should McFadden rule for the committee's request, Trump's attorneys claim further that Neal's proffered legislative purpose—oversight of mandatory presidential tax audits—is merely a pretext for securing and publicizing Trump's IRS 1040s forms.

In December 2021, McFadden dismissed Committee on Ways & Means v. U.S. Department of the Treasury and Trump, a suit brought before him in July 2019 in which the Committee sought the tax returns of then-president Trump. McFadden ruled that Trump was "wrong on the law" and that Congress is due "great deference" in its inquiries, allowing the tax returns to be released to the Committee. He granted a 14-day delay in the release of the returns to allow the parties to negotiate terms of the release, or for Trump to appeal to the DC Circuit Court of Appeals.

Steele dossier
McFadden was assigned to rule on a subpoena hearing in a case regarding a Russian businessman named in the Steele dossier who sued BuzzFeed News for libel for publishing the dossier. Fusion GPS, the research firm which had commissioned the dossier and to whom the subpoenas have been issued, requested that McFadden step down from the case for potential conflict of interest. Fusion GPS alleges that McFadden's connections to Trump—a $1,000 donation to Trump's 2016 campaign, some volunteer work performed by McFadden on Trump's transition team vetting potential Cabinet nominees, and the fact that Trump nominated McFadden to the bench—are grounds for dismissal. McFadden denied the recusal request. McFadden wrote that he has little to no actual connection to the President, who is not a party to the lawsuit but has political interest in the suit, and has never even met the President. McFadden ruled "The President's connection with me and his interest in this case are simply too tenuous to cause a reasonable observer to question my impartiality." Hofstra University law professor James Sample, an authority on the subject of recusal, said that while he found some of the McFadden's contentions "curious," recusal did not appear to be required.

January 6 Capitol attack
In February 2021, McFadden received widespread media attention when he approved a travel request by Jenny Cudd, who was arrested in connection with the 2021 storming of the United States Capitol, and faced two misdemeanor charges of entering a restricted building and violent or disorderly conduct. McFadden granted Cudd's request to travel to Riviera Maya in Mexico for a "weekend retreat with her employees" on the grounds that she had no previous criminal history, with no objection from Cudd's pretrial services officer or the prosecutor. Subsequent to Cudd's filing of her travel request, she was indicted on five federal counts, including one felony, relating to her alleged activities during the January 6, 2021, storming of the United States Capitol. Following Cudd's conviction, Judge McFadden decided to remove weapons restrictions from her probation conditions, even though she had worn a bulletproof vest while storming the Capitol and bragged "I'm proud of everything that I was part of today" and "I would absolutely do it again". Judge McFadden nonetheless agreed with the defendant that a prohibition on weapons possessions was not "reasonably related" to her crime and that she needed a firearm for her own self-defense in the face of "harassment" she had endured following her conviction.

McFadden also received national media attention for suggesting that the January 6 Capitol rioters were being treated more harshly than the rioters in the 2020 Black Lives Matter protests. "The US Attorney's Office would have more credibility if it was even-handed in its concern about riots and mobs in the city," said McFadden during sentencing for one of the Capitol rioters. He later became the first judge to issue an outright acquittal of an accused January 6 rioter who had breached the Capitol grounds, concluding that the defendant "reasonably believed the [Capitol police] officers allowed him into the Capitol."

Vaccination
In March 2022, Judge McFadden blocked a DC rule which would allow minors to elect to be vaccinated without parental consent, concluding that it violated the parents' religious liberty. In his opinion, Judge McFadden described the minors involved in the case as behaving in "classic teenager fashion" by seeking to be vaccinated notwithstanding their parents' disapproval.

Memberships
He has been a member of the Federalist Society since 2003.

Personal life
McFadden grew up in Fairfax Station, VA with his mother, father, and three siblings. He attended Burke Community Church in Burke, VA where his father served as an elder of the church and his brother Kenneth served as the youth pastor in the late 2000's to early 2010's. McFadden and his family currently attend services at Anglican congregation of Falls Church, Virginia, a member of the Anglican Church in North America, which split off from the mainstream Episcopal Church over the latter's positions on homosexuality. McFadden's church membership was brought up by Sheldon Whitehouse during McFadden's nomination to the district court, who asked him whether he would uphold the Supreme Court’s decision allowing same-sex marriage despite his church’s conservative social beliefs. McFadden answered that he would respect the Supreme Court's ruling.

References

External links
 
 Biography at U.S. District Court for the District of Columbia
 

1978 births
Living people
21st-century American lawyers
21st-century American judges
Assistant United States Attorneys
Federalist Society members
Judges of the United States District Court for the District of Columbia
Lawyers from Alexandria, Virginia
Lawyers from Washington, D.C.
American police officers
United States Department of Justice lawyers
United States district court judges appointed by Donald Trump
University of Virginia School of Law alumni
Wheaton College (Illinois) alumni
American Anglican Church in North America members